Kevin Stanley Beeston FCMA is chairman of Elysium Healthcare Limited, Senior Independent Director of Severn Trent plc, and a director of the Premier League.

Career
He has also previously held non-executive positions with industry representative bodies such as the CBI, Chartered Management Institute and Business in the Community.

Previously Beeston was chairman of Serco Group plc until 2010 following a 25-year career with Serco including the roles of chairman since 2002 and previously chief executive and finance director.  Other previous roles include chairman of Tylor Wimpey plc, chairman of Equiniti Group plc, chairman of Domestic and General Limited, chairman of Partnerships in Care, a non-executive director of IMI plc and Marston and a director of Ipswich Town Football Club.

References

External links
Ipswich Town -- Who's Who
CBI Public Services Speech transcript
Interview with Kevin Beeston

1962 births
Living people
Serco people
People from the Borough of Great Yarmouth
English chief executives
Date of birth missing (living people)
Place of birth missing (living people)